Siurgus Donigala is a comune (municipality) in the Province of South Sardinia in the Italian region Sardinia, located about  north of Cagliari.

References

Cities and towns in Sardinia